Peter Masson (31 January 1945 – 29 June 2010) was a Scottish-born English professional darts player who competed in the 1980s and 1990s. The longest-serving international captain in the history of the sport, he won his first cap for Scotland in 1980 and went on to lead his nation for 13 years.

Career

Masson won the Merseyside Darts Championship no fewer than 8 times in his career and was also Scottish Masters champion in 1981 and 1988.

He appeared in the BDO World Darts Championship twice, losing in the first round on both occasions. In 1983, he lost 2–1 to Eric Bristow and in 1985 he lost 2–0 to Jocky Wilson. He also played in the 1981 Winmau World Masters, losing in the first round to Dave Whitcombe. Masson played in four British Professionals, losing in the first round in three of them and reaching the quarter finals in 1982.

Retirement and Death

He retired from competitive darts in 2000 and died on 29 June 2010.

World Championship results

BDO
 1983: 1st Round (lost to Eric Bristow 1–2)
 1985: 1st Round (lost to Jocky Wilson 0–2)

External links
Profile and stats on Darts Database

Scottish darts players
1945 births
2010 deaths
British Darts Organisation players